Acheilognathus changtingensis is a species of freshwater ray-finned fish in the genus Acheilognathus.  It is endemic to China where it is found in the Hanjiang River in Fujian Province.

References

Acheilognathus
Fish described in 2011
Freshwater fish of China